Zachterbergius is a genus of braconid wasps in the family Braconidae. There is at least one described species in Zachterbergius, Z. tenuitergum, found in Thailand.

References

Microgastrinae